Guido Terrena (c.1270 in Perpignan – 1342), also known as Guido Terreni and Guy de Perpignan, was a Catalan Carmelite canon lawyer and scholastic philosopher.

Life
He was a student of Godfrey of Fontaines, and teacher of John Baconthorpe. He became Prior-General of the Carmelites in 1318, bishop of Mallorca, and bishop of Elna. As bishop of Elna he opposed Adhémar IV de Mosset.

A strong proponent of Aristotle, he taught at Avignon.

Works
He was an early infallibilist; the concept of papal infallibility is thought to occur first in a work he wrote concerning the conflict of Pope John XXII (1316–34) and the Franciscan Spirituals. It is said that he adapted this doctrine to papal needs, rather than originating it, and before 1328.

He was a leading member of a small group of infallibilists at the court of Pope John XXII. His position on papal infallibility "so closely anticipated the doctrine of Vatican I that in the judgment of  B.M. Xiberta, the Carmelite scholar who edited [Terreni's] work, 'if he had written it after Vatican I he would have to add or change hardly a single word.'" He wrote: "We are not asking whether a pope can be a heretic in himself but whether he can err in defining anything in the church and obliging the faithful to believe, so that his error does not concern the person of the pope alone but concerns all the faithful and the whole church of Christ. For an error concerning his person can inhere in the pope, but not an error concerning the whole church."

He was one of those opposing the views of Arnold of Villanova on the Antichrist; and he first dubbed Joachim of Fiore a heretic. He was asked, with Pierre de la Palud, to report on Peter John Olivi's apocalyptic writing.

He wrote commentaries on Aristotle's De anima, Nicomachean Ethics, Metaphysics, and Physics.

Other works include the Errores Sarracenorum against Islam, a Summa de haresibus and a Decretum commentary.

Burial place
Guido was buried in the Carmelite church in Avignon.

References
 A. Fidora, Guido Terreni, O. Carm. (†1342). Studies and Texts (= Textes et études du moyen age, 78), Turnhout: Brepols Publishers, 2015, 
Guiu Terreni, Confutatio errorum quorundam magistrorum, ed. Alexander Fidora, Almudena Blasco and Celia López Alcalde, Barcelona: Obrador edéndum, 2014.
B.-M. Xiberta, Guiu Terrena, Carmelita de Perpinyà, (Barcelona 1932)
Jorge J.E. Gracia, The Convertibility of Unum and Ens According to Guido Terrena, Franciscan Studies, 33, 1973, pp. 143–170
T. Shogimen, William of Ockham and Guido Terreni, History of Political Thought, 19, 4, 1998, pp. 517–530
C. Schabel, Early Carmelites between Giants. Questions on Future Contingents by Gerard of Bologna and Guy Terrena. Recherches de Théologie et Philosophie Médiévales 70 (2003) 139–205.

Notes

External links
List of Works at Liste lateinischer Autoren und anonymer Werke des 13. Jahrhunderts (ca. 1170-1320)

1342 deaths
Carmelites
Priors General of the Order of Carmelites
Scholastic philosophers
Latin commentators on Aristotle
Canon law jurists
Bishops of Elna
Bishops of Lodève
People from Catalonia
Year of birth uncertain
14th-century jurists

14th-century philosophers